In dynamical systems, the Cantor tree is an infinite-genus surface homeomorphic to a sphere with a Cantor set removed. The blooming Cantor tree is a Cantor tree with an infinite number of handles added in such a way that every end is a limit of handles.

See also

Jacob's ladder surface
Loch Ness monster surface

References

Surfaces